California Central Airlines (CCA) was a post-war American scheduled intrastate airline based at Burbank, California.

History
Founded by Charles C. Sherman and Edna K. Sherman in 1946 as Airline Transport Carriers as an irregular carrier, flew its first services in 1946. On 28 January 1948 a Douglas DC-3 (NC36480) crashed at Los Gatos, the airline was rebranded as California Central Airlines. Due to financials difficulties the carrier filed for bankruptcy in 1954 and closed definitely.

Fleet
The California Central Airlines fleet in 1953:
 5  Martin 2-0-2
 1  Lockheed Constellation
 1  Douglas DC-3

See also 
 List of defunct airlines of the United States

References

Airlines established in 1947
Airlines disestablished in 1954
Defunct airlines of the United States
1947 establishments in California
1954 disestablishments in California
Airlines based in California